Rupert Ellis-Brown (26 October 1880 – 28 June 1969) was a sailor from South Africa, who represented his country at the 1924 Summer Olympics in Meulan, France. He served as mayor of Durban during the 1940s.

References

Sources
 
 

South African male sailors (sport)
Sailors at the 1924 Summer Olympics – Monotype
Sailors at the 1928 Summer Olympics – 12' Dinghy
Olympic sailors of South Africa
Colony of Natal people
Sportspeople from Durban
1880 births
1969 deaths